Roscoe Seely Conkling (February 15, 1884 - September 14, 1956) was the Deputy New York Attorney General until 1919. He administered the draft laws in New York during World War I and World War II.

Biography
He was born on February 15, 1884, in Paterson, New Jersey, to William F. Conkling and Priscilla Mason of Northville, New York. He graduated from Amherst College in 1908.

He was the Deputy New York Attorney General until 1919.

After a long illness, he died on the night of September 14, 1956, at his apartment in the Irving Hotel in Manhattan, New York City. His was 72 years old.

References

1884 births
1956 deaths
People from Paterson, New Jersey
New York (state) lawyers
20th-century American lawyers
People from Manhattan